Benjamin Mata (born 10 August 1998) is a Cook Islands footballer who currently plays as a central defender for Wellington Olympic and the Cook Islands national team.

Club career 
Mata began his youth career with Wanderers SC. After his departure from the club he joined Onehunga Sports. The following season he was signed to the reserve side of Wellington Phoenix of the A-League. He was one of two players to receive the Winston Reid Scholarship to join the club.

In 2017 he committed to play college soccer in the United States for the Bears of Missouri State University. However, he did not go on to appear for the team. 

In 2018 Mata joined Papakura City for one season. In 2019 he joined Tupapa Maraerenga of the Cook Islands Round Cup. He made two appearances for the club in  2019 OFC Champions League qualification, scoring three goals.

Later in 2019 he moved to Team Wellington. He remained with the club until 2021 when he signed across town with Wellington Olympic. During his first season with Olympic, Mata helped the team win the Central League title that season. After the move to Olympic he was named captain of the squad.

International 
Mata represented his native New Zealand at the youth level. He made his debut for the nation at the 2015 OFC U-17 Championship. After qualifying as champions of the 2017 OFC U-17 Championship, he was then part of the squad that advanced to the round of 16 in the 2017 FIFA U-17 World Cup. He captained the side in the team's round of 16 loss to Brazil.

In March 2022 it was confirmed that Mata had committed to representing the Cook Islands internationally and had been included in the nation’s squad for 2022 FIFA World Cup qualification. He went on to make his senior international debut on 17 March 2022 in the opening match against the Solomon Islands. He served as captain of the squad in his first-ever appearance.

International career statistics

Personal
Mata was born in Auckland, New Zealand. He is the brother of fellow footballer Max Mata.

References

External links
National Football Teams profile
Soccerway profile
Missouri State Bears profile

Living people
1998 births
Association football defenders
Cook Islands international footballers
Cook Island footballers
New Zealand expatriate association footballers
New Zealand youth international footballers